The Korea Transport Institute (KOTI) is a think tank under the Prime Minister's Office in South Korea. Commissioned research is by order of the Ministry of Land, Infrastructure and Transport (MOLIT) and local government. It relocated to the Sejong National Research Complex in Sejong City in December 2014.

History
KOTI was founded through Article 32 of the Civil Act in November 1985 and official began operation August 1987 under article 24 of the Urban Traffic Readjustment Promotion Act. In 1999 it joined the National Research Council for Economics, Humanities, and Social Sciences (NRCS) and moved to the Construction & Transport Research Complex in Goyang City until it moved to Sejong City in December 2014. As of December 2017, the current president is OH Jaehak and is the 14th president of KOTI. The position was previously held by LEE Chang Woon.

Organization
KOTI consists of 300 personnel of which 230 are in research positions and a total of 99 are Ph.D. holders. Under the president are nine departments with 22 divisions. Researcher exchange programs exist with Organisation for Economic Co-operation and Development (OECD), Asian Development Bank (ADB), and the World Bank.

 Dept. of The Fourth Industrial Revolution & Transport
 Dept. of Comprehensive Transport
 Dept. of Road Transport
 Dept. of Rail Transport
 Dept. of Aviation
 Dept. of Logistics
 Dept. of National Transport Big Data
 Dept. of Global Transport Cooperation
 Dept. of Planning and Administration

Publications

Korean Language
 Research Book Series - focuses on major transport issues in Korea, grouped by theme
 Research Reports - short-term research and analysis on transport issues and policy problem
 Commissioned Research Reports - as commissioned by the government and domestic/international research organizations
 Journal of Transport Research (교통연구) - quarterly academic journal with articles written by those in universities, research institutes, and businesses
 Transport (교통) - monthly publication focusing on current Korean and international transport policies and research
 KOTI Brief - biweekly research report newsletter
 KOTI Themed Briefs - briefs issued by specific research focuses within KOTI including KOTI KTDB, aviation policy, sustainable transport, logistics, bicycle, and Northeast Asia

English Language
 KOTI World Brief - monthly newsletter with selected articles translated from the KOTI Brief
 Toward an Integrated Green Transportation System in Korea - series which takes KOTI World Brief articles and collects them into themes
 KSP Series - book series focusing on Korea's major transport policies and technological developments

References

External links

KOTI Websites
 Main KOTI website 
 Main KOTI website 
 Korea Transport Database (KTDB)
 Freight Transport Market Research Center 
 Center for Northeast Asia and North Korea Transport Studies 
 Logistics Technology 
 Center for Certified Integrated-Logistics Company 
 Sustainable Transport Research Project 
 Bicycle Transport Portal 
 Building Leaders in Urban Transport Program (LUTP)

Related sites
 Ministry of Transport, Infrastructure and Transport (MOLIT) 
 National Research Council for Economics, Humanities, and Social Sciences (NRC)

Transport in South Korea
Research institutes in South Korea
Think tanks established in 1985
Research institutes established in 1985
Sejong City
1985 establishments in South Korea